Labrador Sea Water is an intermediate water mass characterized by cold water, relatively low salinity compared to other intermediate water masses, and high concentrations of both oxygen and anthropogenic tracers.  It is formed by convective processes in the Labrador Sea located between Greenland and the northeast coast of the Labrador Peninsula.  Deep convection in the Labrador Sea allows colder water to sink forming this water mass, which is a contributor to the upper layer of North Atlantic Deep Water.  North Atlantic Deep Water flowing southward is integral to the Atlantic Meridional Overturning Circulation.  The Labrador Sea experiences a net heat loss to the atmosphere annually.

Formation 
Convection in the Labrador Sea is the result of a combination of cyclonic oceanographic circulation of the sea currents and cyclonic atmospheric forcing.  At the southern tip of Greenland, water enters the West Greenland Current from the East Greenland Current, continues to flow northwest around the Baffin Bay, and then southeast into the Baffin Island Current continuing in the same direction in the Labrador Current.   Sea ice in the winter months inhibits surface flow into Baffin Bay.  The Labrador Current and the Western Greenland Current flow in opposite directions resulting in a cyclonic eddy.  During winter months low pressure dominates in this region, and in years with a positive North Atlantic Oscillation deeper convection is observed.

Spreading 
Labrador Sea Water spreads through the North Atlantic Ocean by three routes: northeast directly into the Irminger Sea, into the eastern North Atlantic by means of the deep North Atlantic current, and meridionally via the Deep Western Boundary Current.  Oceanographer Robert Pickart, in a paper published in 2002, presented data that suggest that the Labrador Sea is not the only formation site for Labrador Sea Water.  They observed similar convective processes in the Irminger Sea and noted that transit times for Labrador Sea Water into Irminger Sea were unusually fast, suggesting that there is another source in the Irminger Sea.

Variability 
Labrador Sea Water properties experience seasonal and interannual variations.  In late spring and summer, large amounts of cold freshwater accumulate from melting ice and are mixed downward during convection.  The source for heat in the Labrador Sea is modified North Atlantic Current water after circulating the subpolar gyre.   In winter the sea becomes more saline as freshwater freezes to form sea ice.  The greatest seasonal variability is largely confined to the surface waters, however an annual cycle of convective mixing and re-stratification is observed throughout the water column.  Warming and increased salinity in the lower level and freshening at the surface is associated with re-stratification (May–December), whereas a convective mixing period (January–April) leads to cooling and a decrease in salt content in intermediate and deep waters and an increase in salt content at the surface.  
Interannual variations in the intermediate Labrador Sea Water are due largely to changes in convection throughout these periods.  Weak convective periods are associated with more heat in the water column and deep convective periods are characterized by cold water.  In the early 1990s, several consecutive severe winters contributed towards deep convection in the Labrador Sea.  These winters were also associated with strong positive fluctuations in the North Atlantic Oscillation.  Labrador Sea Water became very cold, fresh, and dense during this period, and the layer extended to depths of 2300m in the spring of 1994.  Due to weakened convection, Labrador Sea Water began warming significantly and increased in salinity over the following decade.  This trend continued through 2010 and 2011 when weak convection was observed in relation with negative North Atlantic Oscillation.  Deep convection was observed again in 2012 with the Labrador Sea Water reaching 1400m, corresponding with a positive North Atlantic Oscillation similar to those seen in the early 1990s.

See also
Labrador Sea
North Atlantic Deep Water
Atlantic Ocean
North Atlantic Oscillation

References

Oceanography